Donghe may refer to:

China
Donghe District, a district in Baotou, Inner Mongolia
, a town in Dongfang, Hainan
Donghe, Jishou, a subdistrict of Jishou, Hunan
, town in Lishu County, Siping, Jilin
Donghe Township, Lancang County in Lancang Lahu Autonomous County, Pu'er, Yunnan
 in Xide County, Liangshan Yi Autonomous Prefecture, Sichuan
, a town in Wangcang County, Guangyuan, Sichuan

Taiwan
Donghe, Taitung, a township in Taitung County
, a village in Nanzhuang, Miaoli

See also
East River (disambiguation), or Dōnghé in Mandarin Chinese
Đông Hà, a city in Quảng Trị Province, Vietnam

zh:東河